Pankkee Arena is a football stadium in Roi Et, Thailand. The stadium is the home stadium of Roi Et United of Thai League 4. The Arena opened for football match competition on 1 April 2017.

References

Football venues in Thailand
Buildings and structures in Roi Et province